Gadimyxa atlantica is a species of parasitic myxozoan. Together with G. arctica and G. sphaerica, they infect Gadus morhua and Arctogadus glacialis by developing coelozoically in bisporic plasmodia in their urinary systems. These 3 species' spores exhibit two morphological forms: wide and subspherical, being both types bilaterally symmetrical along the suture line. The wide spores have a mean width ranging from 7.5-10μm, respectively, while the subspherical ones range from 5.3-8μm in mean width. The subspherical forms of Gadimyxa are similar to Ortholinea, differing in the development of the spores and in the arrangement of the polar capsules. Polychaetes Spirorbisspecies act as invertebrate hosts of G. atlantica.

References

Further reading
Rangel, Luís F., et al. "Morphology, molecular data, and development of Zschokkella mugilis (Myxosporea, Bivalvulida) in a polychaete alternate host, Nereis diversicolor." Journal of Parasitology 95.3 (2009): 561–569.
Holzer, Astrid S., et al. "Infection dynamics of two renal myxozoans in hatchery reared fry and juvenile Atlantic cod Gadus morhua L." Parasitology137.10 (2010): 1501–1513.
Holzer, Astrid Sibylle, Rod Wootten, and Christina Sommerville. "Zschokkella hildae Auerbach, 1910: Phylogenetic position, morphology, and location in cultured Atlantic cod." Parasitology international 59.2 (2010): 133–140.
Jørgensen, A., et al. "Real‐time PCR detection of Parvicapsula pseudobranchicola (Myxozoa: Myxosporea) in wild salmonids in Norway."Journal of fish diseases 34.5 (2011): 365–371.

External links
WORMS

Parvicapsulidae
Animals described in 2007